Philippe Henri de Girard patented in France spinning frames for both the dry and wet spinning of flax.  His inventions were also patented in England in 1815, in the name of Horace Hall.
Little is known about Horace Hall, it is a possible pseudonym. Undoubtedly if he had taken out his patent in England in 1815, the year of the Battle of Waterloo, in a French name there would not have been a lot of enthusiasm for it; possibly even suspicion.

In the British Isles James Kay was initially credited with the invention of this device. On 2 December 1826 shortly after Kay's patent was awarded, Philippe Henri de Girard wrote to the Editor of The Manchester Guardian complaining about and pointing out he had been the inventor. The following is an extract from his letter:

Kay's patent was invalidated, in 1839, on the grounds it was too similar to Horace Hall's; A decision upheld on appeal, in 1841.

References

Manchester Guardian, 2 Dec.,1826

Private family history sources:
Horace Hall was an English businessman living in Livorno (Leghorn) and Florence, Italy (1790-1867).  (IJR - 17-08-2017)

English businesspeople
Year of birth missing
Year of death missing